The Royal Insurance Building is a historic building located at Queen Avenue, Liverpool, Merseyside, England. It was built as the head office of the Royal Insurance Company and was used until they moved to a building on New John Street in 1903.

Architecture
The building was designed by Samuel Rowland in the Neoclassical style and completed in 1839. The design involved a symmetrical main frontage with five bays facing onto Queen Avenue; the central section of three bays formed a tetrastyle portico with fluted Doric order columns supporting an entablature. There were Ionic order columns spanning the first and second floors which supported a frieze and a pediment.

See also

Grade II* listed buildings in Merseyside
Architecture of Liverpool

References

Grade II* listed buildings in Liverpool